Orring (Korring) is an Upper Cross River language spoken by the Orring people of Nigeria.

Related dialects 
Dialects are classified under a particular community. Dialects are named by prefixing the community name with the letter K. Eteji (Ntezi) speak K'eteji, Lame (Okpoto) speak Ki'lame, Idzem (Amuda) speak K'idzem, Okpolo (Opkomoro) speak K'okpolo, Uffium( Effium) speak K'uffium in Ebonyi State, Nigeria. Ufia (Utonkon) in Benue State speak K'ufia. Ukelle, in Cross River State, speak K'ukelle.

Abakaliki territory
Owing to their heritage in Ebonyi State, Abakaliki scholars such as C.C Ugoh in his book Gods of Abakaliki stated that the Orring people settled in Abakaliki territory prior to the coming of the four major Igbo groups of Ezza, Izzi, Ikwo and Ngbo. Other writers mentioned the Orring as the aboriginals of Abakaliki region prior to the coming of the Igbo groups. 

Orring intermarried with Igbo and created a hybrid culture. The Orring settled in Ntezi-Aba in Abakaliki before spreading to other settlements within Ebonyi State. Abakaliki is a Mbembe term the emerged before the coming of the later Abakaliki People.

References
3. ^ Ajifo, Hillary Nnamdi (2017). Intergroup relations of Korring speaking people and their neighbours. Project documents, department of History and International Relations, Ebonyi State University.

4. ^ Aleke, Patrick Awo (2012). Idzem (Amuda) People: Predicament and Cultural Ties. 

Languages of Nigeria
Upper Cross River languages

5. U.U. Ugoh (2012). gods of Abakaliki.